The 2011 North Carolina Tar Heels men's soccer team represented the University of North Carolina at Chapel Hill in all NCAA Division I men's soccer competitions. The Tar Heels were coached by Carlos Somoano. It was Somoano's first season in charge of the Tar Heels following Elmar Bolowich's departure to coach the Creighton Bluejays men's soccer program.

The season proved to be one of the most successful seasons in program history. The  Tar Heels completed a college "treble", winning the ACC regular season, the ACC Tournament and the NCAA Tournament.

Background

Review

Team

Roster 

The following players were on the roster during the 2011 season.

Staff

Match results 

|-
!colspan=6 style="background:#56A0D3; color:#FFFFFF;"| Preseason
|-
|-
!colspan=6 style="background:#56A0D3; color:#FFFFFF;"| Regular Season
|-

|-
!colspan=6 style="background:#56A0D3; color:#FFFFFF;"| ACC Tournament
|-

|-
!colspan=6 style="background:#56A0D3; color:#FFFFFF;"| NCAA Tournament
|-

|-
!colspan=6 style="background:#56A0D3; color:#FFFFFF;"| NCAA College Cup
|-

|-

Statistics

Transfers and recruits

References 

North Carolina Tar Heels
North Carolina Tar Heels, Men
North Carolina Tar Heels, Men
Tar Heels
NCAA Division I Men's Soccer Tournament-winning seasons
NCAA Division I Men's Soccer Tournament College Cup seasons
North Carolina Tar Heels men's soccer seasons
North Carolina Tar Heels
2011